John Godfrey Fitzmaurice Day (12 May 1874 – 26 September 1938) was a 20th-century Church of Ireland Archbishop.

Biography
Day was born into an ecclesiastical family; his father was Maurice Day, later Bishop of Clogher. Educated at Oakham School and Pembroke College, Cambridge (whence he gained his Cambridge Master of Arts (MA Cantab)), he was ordained deacon in Worcester in 1897 and priest in London in 1899. He was a Missionary for the Cambridge Mission to Delhi until 1909 when he became Vicar of St Ann's Church, Dublin (1913–21).   He became Bishop of Ossory, Ferns and Leighlin in 1920, holding the post for 18 years. In 1938 he was elected Archbishop of Armagh but died within two months of taking office, having at some point become a Doctor of Divinity (DD).

References

External links
 

1874 births
1938 deaths
People educated at Oakham School
Alumni of Pembroke College, Cambridge
Bishops of Ossory, Ferns and Leighlin
20th-century Anglican bishops in Ireland
Anglican archbishops of Armagh
20th-century Anglican archbishops